Jirayu Raksakaew (RTGS: Chirayu Raksakaeo, born 3 August 1987) is a member of the Thailand men's national volleyball team.

Career 
Jirayu played the 2017 season on loan with the Thai club Air Force.

Clubs 
  Chakungrao - Armed forces (2009–2010)
  Chonburi (2011–2013)
  Le Lausanne Université Club  (2014–2015)
  Chonburi E-tech Air Force (2015–2016)
  Malidivian Sport & Recreation Club (2016)
  Ratchaburi (2016–2017)
  Air Force (2017)
  NK Fitness Samutsakhon (2017–2018)
  Diamond Food (2018–2021)

Awards

Individual 
 2009–10 Thailand League "Best Scorer"
 2009–10 Thailand League "Best Spiker"
 2010–11 Thailand League "Best Server"
 2011–12 Thailand League "Most Valuable Player"
 2011–12 Thailand League "Best Scorer"
 2011–12 Thailand League "Best Spiker"
 2011–12 Thailand League "Best Server"
 2012–13 Thailand League "Best Scorer"
 2016 Thai-Denmark Super League "Best Blocker"
 2016–17 Thailand League "Best Opposite"
 2019–20 Thailand League "Best Server"

Clubs 
 2009–10 Thailand League -  Champion, with Chakungrao - Armed forces
 2010–11 Thailand League -  Champion, with Chonburi
 2011–12 Thailand League -  Champion, with Chonburi
 2012–13 Thailand League -  Bronze medal, with Chonburi
 2013–14 Thailand League -  Runner-Up, with Chonburi
 2014 Thai-Denmark Super League -  Champion, with Chonburi
 2015–16 Thailand League -  Bronze medal, with Chonburi E-Tech Air Force
 2016–17 Thailand League -  Bronze medal, with Ratchaburi
 2018 Thai–Denmark Super League -  Runner-Up, with Visakha
 2018–19 Thailand League -  Runner-Up, with Saraburi
 2019 Thai–Denmark Super League -  Third, with Saraburi
 2019–20 Thailand League -  Silver medal, with Diamond Food
 2020–21 Thailand League -  Silver medal, with Diamond Food

References

1987 births
Living people
Jirayu Raksakaew
Volleyball players at the 2010 Asian Games
Volleyball players at the 2014 Asian Games
Volleyball players at the 2018 Asian Games
Jirayu Raksakaew
Thai expatriate sportspeople in Switzerland
Thai expatriate sportspeople in the Maldives
Jirayu Raksakaew
Jirayu Raksakaew
Southeast Asian Games medalists in volleyball
Competitors at the 2009 Southeast Asian Games
Competitors at the 2011 Southeast Asian Games
Competitors at the 2013 Southeast Asian Games
Competitors at the 2015 Southeast Asian Games
Competitors at the 2017 Southeast Asian Games
Jirayu Raksakaew
Jirayu Raksakaew